Dylan Karol Hundley is an American actress, singer and visual artist best known for playing Sally Fowler in the 1990 Academy Award-nominated film Metropolitan and as lead singer of the New York post-punk / new wave band Lulu Lewis.

Early life
Hundley was born in Reno, Nevada, to Sandra Lee Ison and Monty Hundley, who was later convicted of fraud. She was brought up in The Bahamas, New Jersey and Manhattan. Hundley attended The Lenox School from 6th through 12th grades.

Career

Early career
At age 17 Hundley enrolled in The Groundlings summer improvisation program (at her then best friend Christa Miller's suggestion) and then a 2-year Meisner technique program with Ron Stetson of The Neighborhood Playhouse. During this time nightclub promoter Baird Jones introduced her to director Whit Stillman. Hundley was a socialite in the 1980s New York downtown art and literary scene, and friends with Bret Easton Ellis and Jay McInerney. She regularly appeared in the social pages of WWD, Interview Magazine, Vogue and Details, often photographed by her longtime friend Patrick McMullan.

She moved to Los Angeles in 1990 and entered a similar social environment, while pursuing her acting career, spending time with many of the top names in entertainment including Mick Jagger, Donovan Leitch and Joe Strummer, and dating such notable performers as Harvey Keitel and Tom Verlaine. She was house DJ at Johnny Depps Viper Room for three years and was working there the evening actor River Phoenix overdosed there. Quentin Tarantino was her next-door neighbor during the years he made Reservoir Dogs and Pulp Fiction.

Hundley returned to New York City in 1997 and has remained there since, making independent films and music.

Film career
Hundley's first movie role was in Stillman's independent film Metropolitan (1990). Other film credits include Dangerous Game (1993), The Last Days of Disco (1998), Jacklight (1999), A Holiday Affair (2000) and Forever (2005).

Hundley continued performance studies during these years with Susan Peretz, Marcia Haufrecht and Sandra Lee, all of the Actors Studio. She produced the feature film Buzzkill (2012), starring Kristen Ritter, Daniel Raymont, and Darrell Hammond, released in association with the Chicago-based improvisational comedy enterprise The Second City, many of whose alumni appear in the film.

In 2015, Vanity Fair celebrated the 25th anniversary of Metropolitan with a full cast portrait in its August 2015 issue. Editor Graydon Carter is a well-known fan of the film.

Music career
In 2016 Hundley formed Lulu Lewis with her Argentinian-born multi-instrumentalist husband, Pablo Martin of the Tom Tom Club and The Du-Rites. It released its debut self-titled EP in the summer of 2017 to critical acclaim. This led to live dates supporting Richard Lloyd of Television, Gene Loves Jezebel, Shilpa Ray, The Waldos and The Fleshtones. Live band members include Jay Mumford (J-Zone), William Harvey and Bruce Martin, also Tom Tom Club.

In May 2018, Condé Nast released a bio video on Hundley covering her previous struggles with domestic violence and the launch of Lulu Lewis after breaking free. In October 2018 Megyn Kelly interviewed her on the Today Show about the same topics. This was the same day that Kelly made racist remarks about Halloween costumes for which she was fired from the show.

In January 2019, Hundley was asked to front NPR's Bob Boilen's original band Tiny Desk Unit, in a memorial concert for Susan Mumford, the original singer who died in September 2018, at Washington DC's 9:30 Club.

Lulu Lewis released its debut LP, Genuine Psychic, in July 2019 to critical acclaim. Its release show was held at Union Pool in Brooklyn, New York. It supported The Messthetics (former Fugazi members). Brendan Canty of both bands also guested on Lulu Lewis's debut LP.

Lulu Lewis then released dub versions of four tracks from the LP, For Entertainment Purposes Only, and was featured in The Big Takeover for the EP. On February 14, 2020, it released The Love Song EP, an album of cover songs, including Roxy Music's "In Every Dream Home a Heartache", John Cale's "Helen of Troy" and The Vinyl District's "I'll Bet You" by Funkadelic.

Hundley regularly participates in The Bowery Electric - Sally Can't Dance Shows as a guest singer. She has performed in tributes alongside punk stalwarts and underground music luminaries in shows devoted to The Cramps, Talking Heads and Stiv Bators.

Personal life
Hundley has one child, Harper Ace, born in 2007. She has been married to Pablo Martin since 2016. She lives in Dobbs Ferry, New York.

References

External links
Lulu Lewis official site

Living people
Actresses from Reno, Nevada
Musicians from Reno, Nevada
American post-punk musicians
American new wave musicians
Year of birth missing (living people)
21st-century American women